Tochak Waegu or To-wae is a South Korean political slang term used mainly by (mainly South Korean liberals or progressives to) attack South Korean "pro-Japanese conservatives". In South Korea, there is a controversy that South Korean conservatives are relatively "pro-Japanese" than South Korean liberals. Tochak Waegu have the same meaning as Maegukno or Minjokbanyeokja.

The reason why conservatives in South Korea are relatively "pro-Japanese" than liberals is because of hardline anti-communism, especially against North Korea caused by the Korean War. In addition, post-war Japan is an ally of the United States.

Political position 
The term is commonly used to criticize South Korean conservatives' foreign policy toward Japan. It is also used as a derogatory expression of those who show a de-nationalist view of Japan that deviates from the existing Korean nationalist view, or even partially sympathize with Japanese historical revisionism. However, the term is also used as a political hate speech to slander Japaense people and all South Korean conservatives.

Some South Korean scholars argue that among South Koreans, Empire of Japan should be defended or Japanese historical revisionist supporters should be legally regulated, which, according to them, has the same legitimacy as many European countries regulate Neo-Nazism or Holocaust denial. However, such legally regulations do not exist in South Korea for the reason of freedom of speech.

In South Korean politics, liberals or progressives and conservatives tend to criticize each other as "pro-Japan" and "Pro-Pyongyang" (or "Jongbuk"). South Korea has historically experienced Japanese colonial rule and the Korean War, so the former is regarded as the "fascist" or "far-right" and the latter as the "ppalgaengi" or "far-left". Thus, South Korean politicians (mainly liberal politicians) equate "Tochak Waegu" with "far-right".

Sin-chinilpa 
"Sin-chinilpa" is used in a similar sense to "Tochak Waegu". The term "Sin-chinilpa" was first proposed by Japanese-born naturalized South Korean and South Korean liberal historian Yuji Hosaka, and is frequently used by South Korean media and netizens.

Criticism 
A column in the JoongAng Ilbo, a moderate conservative media, criticized the expression Tochak Waegu as similar to (liberal version) McCarthyism. In an article written in the centre-left liberal media Hankyoreh, left-wing socialist Hong Se-hwa criticized it as "government-led nationalism"  that has nothing to do with left-wing nationalism and criticized right-wing Japanese nationalism and hostile symbiosis. Some Koreans see the term "Waegu" as a racist rhetoric against Japanese people, but others argue that it is not racist.

See also 
 Anti-imperialism
 Anti-Japanese sentiment in Korea
 Chinilpa
 Democratic Party of Korea#Controversy
 Harki – These are 'indigenous Algerians' (or 'native Algerians'), but they cooperated with France during the Algerian War.
 Jjokbari
 New Right (South Korea)
 No Japan Movement
 Park Yu-ha
 Japanese fascism
 Treason
 Uncle Tom
 Yoon Suk-yeol#Pro-Japanese colonialist controversy

References 

Anti-imperialism in Korea
Anti-Japanese sentiment in South Korea
Conservatism in South Korea
Far-right politics in South Korea
Korean slang
Political slurs for people
Political terminology in South Korea
Postcolonialism
Sadaejuui
Treason